Stone Arch Bridge over McCormick's Creek is a historic arch bridge located at McCormick's Creek State Park in Washington Township, Owen County, Indiana.  It was built by the Civilian Conservation Corps in 1934, and is solidly constructed of mortared roughcut limestone.  The round arch has a 54-foot span and reaches approximately 25 feet high.

It was listed on the National Register of Historic Places in 1993.

References

Civilian Conservation Corps in Indiana
Road bridges on the National Register of Historic Places in Indiana
Bridges completed in 1934
Transportation buildings and structures in Owen County, Indiana
National Register of Historic Places in Owen County, Indiana
Stone arch bridges in the United States
1934 establishments in Indiana